The Second Jungle Book is a sequel to The Jungle Book by Rudyard Kipling. First published in 1895, it features five stories about Mowgli and three unrelated stories, all but one set in India, most of which Kipling wrote while living in Vermont. All of the stories were previously published in magazines in 18945, often under different titles. The 1994 film The Jungle Book used it as a source.

Contents
Each story is followed by a related poem:

 "How Fear Came": This story takes place before Mowgli fights Shere Khan. During a drought, Mowgli and the animals gather at a shrunken Wainganga River for a Water Truce" where the display of the blue-colored Peace Rock prevents anyone from hunting at its riverbanks. After Shere Khan was driven away by him for nearly defiling the Peace Rock, Hathi the elephant tells Mowgli the story of how the first tiger got his stripes when fear first came to the jungle. This story can be seen as a forerunner of the Just So Stories.
 "The Law of the Jungle" (poem)
 "The Miracle of Purun Bhagat": An influential Indian politician abandons his worldly goods to become an ascetic holy man. Later, he must save a village from a landslide with the help of the local animals whom he has befriended.
 "A Song of Kabir" (poem)
 "Letting in the Jungle": Mowgli has been driven out of the human village for witchcraft, and the superstitious villagers are preparing to kill his adopted parents Messua and her unnamed husband. Mowgli rescues them and then prepares to take revenge.
 "Mowgli's Song Against People" (poem)
 "The Undertakers": A mugger crocodile, a jackal and a Greater adjutant stork, three of the most unpleasant characters on the river, spend an afternoon bickering with each other until some Englishmen arrive to settle some unfinished business with the crocodile.
 "A Ripple Song" (poem)
 "The King's Ankus": Mowgli discovers a jewelled object beneath the Cold Lairs, which he later discards carelessly, not realising that men will kill each other to possess it. Note: the first edition of The Second Jungle Book inadvertently omits the final 500 words of this story, in which Mowgli returns the treasure to its hiding-place to prevent further killings. Although the error was corrected in later printings, it was picked up by some later editions.
 "The Song of the Little Hunter" (poem)
 "Quiquern": A teenaged Inuit boy and girl set out across the arctic ice on a desperate hunt for food to save their tribe from starvation, guided by the mysterious animal-spirit Quiquern. However, Quiquern is not what he seems.
 "Angutivaun Taina" (poem)
 "Red Dog": Mowgli's wolfpack is threatened by a pack of rampaging dholes. Mowgli asks Kaa the python to help him formulate a plan to defeat them.
 "Chil's Song" (poem)
 "The Spring Running": Mowgli, now almost seventeen years old, is growing restless for reasons he cannot understand. On an aimless run through the jungle he stumbles across the village where his adopted mother Messua is now living with her two-year-old son, and is torn between staying with her and returning to the jungle.
 "The Outsong" (poem)

Characters

 Mowgli – A young human boy of Indian ancestry who has been raised by wolves since infancy
 Father Wolf – An Indian wolf who is Raksha's mate
 Raksha – An Indian wolf
 Mang – A bat
 Bagheera – A black panther
 Baloo – A bear
 Kaa – An Indian python
 Tabaqui – A golden jackal
 Akela – An Indian wolf
 Jacala – A mugger crocodile
 The Red Dogs – dholes
 Ikki – An Indian crested porcupine
 Hathi – An Indian elephant
 Grey Brother – One of Mother and Father Wolf's cubs
 Ko – A carrion crow

Derivative sequels
The Third Jungle Book, 1992 book by Pamela Jekel, consisting of new Mowgli stories, in an imitation of Kipling's style.
The Second Jungle Book: Mowgli & Baloo, 1997 film starring Jamie Williams as Mowgli, but the film's story has little or no connection with the stories in Rudyard Kipling's The Second Jungle Book.

See also

 Works of Rudyard Kipling
 Feral children in mythology and fiction

External links

The Jungle Book Collection: a website demonstrating the variety of merchandise related to the book and film versions of The Jungle Books
 

1895 short story collections
Short story collections by Rudyard Kipling
19th-century British children's literature
The Jungle Book
Macmillan Publishers books
British children's books
Children's short story collections
Animal tales
1890s children's books
Sequel books